George II (Giorgi II) also known as George the Bad, the Mad or the Evil (Av-Giorgi, ავგიორგი) (1464–1513), of the Bagrationi Dynasty, was a king of Kakheti in eastern Georgia from 1511 to 1513.

Life
He was the eldest son of King Alexander I of Kakheti by his wife Queen Ana. He is reported by the Georgian chronicles to have been extremely grasping and ambitious and to have had frequent conflicts with his peace-loving father, insisting that Alexander made war upon the rival Bagrationi branch presiding over Kakheti’s western neighbor, the Kingdom of Kartli. Also, he was suspicious of his younger brother, Demetre, whom Alexander had entrusted an important diplomatic mission to the Shah of Iran, Ismail I.

On April 27, 1511, George murdered Alexander, had Demetre blinded, and seized the crown. Immediately after his accession to the throne, George II organized an expedition against Kartli, and attempted to depose King David X. David’s brother, Bagrat I, Prince of Mukhrani, who led the successful defense of the kingdom, was rewarded with the castle of Mukhrani, thus founding a long-lasting branch of Bagration-Mukhraneli. In 1513, George II made another incursion into Kartli, but was again defeated and ambushed by Bagrat’s men on his route back to Kakheti. George was put in the Mtveri castle where he was soon killed. Kakheti was briefly annexed to Kartli.

Family 
George was survived by his wife, Elene née Irubakidze-Cholokashvili (died 1532), and three children:
Leon of Kakheti (1503–1574)
Princess Khvaramze (died 1528), who married Vakhtang, brother of King Bagrat III of Imereti
Princess Mariam (died 1555)

References

1464 births
1513 deaths
Bagrationi dynasty of the Kingdom of Kakheti
Kings of Kakheti
Patricides
Regicides